Eriopsela is a genus of moths belonging to the subfamily Olethreutinae of the family Tortricidae.

Species
Eriopsela aeriana (Falkovitsh, in Danilevsky, Kuznetsov & Falkovitsh, 1962)
Eriopsela annana (Kennel, 1918)
Eriopsela danilevskyi Kuznetzov, 1972
Eriopsela falkovitshi Kostyuk, 1979
Eriopsela fenestrellensis Huemer, 1991
Eriopsela klapperichi Razowski, 1967
Eriopsela klimeschi Obraztsov, 1952
Eriopsela kostyuki (Kuznetzov, 1973)
Eriopsela mongunana Kostyuk, 1973
Eriopsela quadrana (Hübner, [1811-1813])
Eriopsela rosinana (Kennel, 1918)

See also
List of Tortricidae genera

References

External links
tortricidae.com

Tortricidae genera
Olethreutinae
Taxa named by Achille Guenée